Ithystenus wallacei is a species of  straight-snouted weevils belonging to the family Brentidae.

Distribution 
This species can be found in Western Papua; Aru Islands, Mysol Island.

References 

 Biolib
 Global Names
 Alessandra Sforzi  The Straight-snouted Weevils (Coleoptera: Curculionoidea, Brentidae) of Papua Indonesia
 Gregory P. Setliff  Annotated checklist of weevils from the Papuan region

Brentidae
Beetles described in 1862
Taxa named by Francis Polkinghorne Pascoe